The  Pedernales least gecko (Sphaerodactylus randi) is a species of lizard in the family Sphaerodactylidae. The species is endemic to the Dominican Republic.

Etymology
The specific name, randi, is in honor of American herpetologist Austin Stanley Rand (1932–2005).

The subspecific name, strahmi, is in honor of herpetologist Michael H. Strahm.

Habitat
This species inhabits dry forests and coastal scrubs, where it has been found beneath piles of organic debris like piles of coconut husks.

Reproduction
S. randi is oviparous.

Subspecies
Three subspecies are recognized as being valid, including the nominotypical subspecies.
Sphaerodactylus randi methorius 
Sphaerodactylus randi randi 
Sphaerodactylus randi strahmi

References

Further reading
Rösler H (2000). "Kommentierte Liste der rezent, subrezent und fossil bekannten Geckotaxa (Reptilia: Gekkonomorpha)". Gekkota 2: 28–153. (Sphaerodactylus randi, p. 113). (in German).
Schwartz A (1977). "The geckoes (Sauria, Gekkonidae) of the genus Sphaerodactylus of the Dominican Península de Barahona, Hispaniola". Proceedings of the Biological Society of Washington 90 (2): 243–254. (Sphaerodactylus randi, new status, pp. 247–248; S. r. methorius, new subspecies, pp. 248–251; S. r. strahmi, new subspecies, pp. 251–253).
Schwartz A, Henderson RW (1991). Amphibians and Reptiles of the West Indies: Descriptions, Distributions, and Natural History. Gainesville, Florida: University of Florida Press. 720 pp. . (Sphaerodactylus randi, p. 525).
Schwartz A, Thomas R (1975). A Check-list of West Indian Amphibians and Reptiles. Carnegie Museum of Natural History Special Publication No. 1. Pittsburgh, Pennsylvania: Carnegie Museum of Natural History. 216 pp. (Sphaerodactylus difficilis randi, new combination, pp. 149–150).
Shreve B (1968). "The notatus group of Sphaerodactylus (Sauria, Gekkonidae) in Hispaniola". Breviora (280): 1-28. (Sphaerodactylus notatus randi, new subspecies, pp. 5–7).

Sphaerodactylus
Reptiles of the Dominican Republic
Endemic fauna of the Dominican Republic
Reptiles described in 1968
Taxa named by Benjamin Shreve